8-Mercaptoquinoline is the organosulfur compound with the formula C9H7NSH.  It is a derivative of the heterocycle quinoline, substituted in the 8-position with a thiol group.  The compound is an analog of 8-hydroxyquinoline, a common chelating agent.  The compound is a colorless solid.

Preparation
Quinoline reacts with chlorosulfuric acid to form quinoline-8-sulfonyl chloride, which reacts with triphenylphosphine in toluene to form 8-mercaptoquinoline.

References

Thiols
Quinolines